Aziz Doufikar (born 3 October 1963) is a retired Moroccan football player.

Doufikar was the first Moroccan professional football player in the Netherlands. He played in the Eredivisie for PEC Zwolle and Fortuna Sittard. Doufikar also spent time playing in Portugal with Sporting Espinho and Vitória Setúbal.

References

1963 births
Living people
Moroccan footballers
PEC Zwolle players
Fortuna Sittard players
Vitória F.C. players
Footballers from Casablanca
Dutch sportspeople of Moroccan descent
Association football midfielders
Dutch expatriate footballers
Dutch expatriate sportspeople in Portugal
Expatriate footballers in Portugal
Dutch footballers
Moroccan expatriate footballers
Moroccan expatriate sportspeople in Portugal